John Buckland may refer to:

John Buckland (English politician) for Westbury (UK Parliament constituency) in 1558
John Richard Buckland (1819–1874), Australian school teacher and first headmaster of The Hutchins School, Tasmania
John Francis Buckland (1825–1910), Australian politician, member of the Legislative Assembly of Queensland
John Buckland (New Zealand politician) (1844–1909), New Zealand politician, represented Waikouaiti electorate 1884 to 1887